Cerithidea balteata is a species of snail, a brackish-water gastropod mollusk in the family Potamididae.

Description
The length of the shell attains 28 mm.

Distribution
This species occurs in brackish waters in the Philippines.

References

External links
 Sowerby, G. B., II. (1855). Monograph of the genus Cerithium, Adanson. In G. B. Sowerby II (ed.), Thesaurus conchyliorum, or monographs of genera of shells. 2 (16): 847–899, pls 176–186. London, privately published
 Reid D.G. (2014) The genus Cerithidea Swainson, 1840 (Gastropoda: Potamididae) in the Indo-West Pacific region. Zootaxa 3775(1): 1–65

Potamididae
Gastropods described in 1855